Shilha, now more commonly known as Tashelhit or Tashlhiyt, is a Berber language spoken in southwestern Morocco. In Moroccan Arabic the language is called , from which the English name Shilha is derived. When referring to the language, anthropologists and historians prefer the name "Shilha", which is in the Oxford English Dictionary (OED). Linguists writing in English prefer "Tashelhit" (or a variant spelling).

Shilha is spoken in an area covering around 100,000 square kilometres, making the language area approximately the size of Iceland, or the US state of Kentucky. The area comprises the western part of the High Atlas mountains and the regions to the south up to the Draa River, including the Anti-Atlas and the alluvial basin of the Souss River. The largest urban centres in the area are the coastal city of Agadir (population over 400,000) and the towns of Guelmim, Taroudant, Oulad Teima, Tiznit and Ouarzazate.

In the north and to the south, Shilha borders Arabic-speaking areas. In the northeast, roughly along the line Demnate-Zagora, there is a dialect continuum with Central Atlas Tamazight. Within the Shilha-speaking area, there are several Arabic-speaking enclaves, notably the town of Taroudant and its surroundings. Substantial Shilha-speaking migrant communities are found in most of the larger towns and cities of northern Morocco and outside Morocco in Belgium, France, Germany, Canada, the United States and Israel.

Shilha possesses a distinct and substantial literary tradition that can be traced back several centuries before the protectorate era. Many texts, written in Arabic script and dating from the late 16th century to the present, are preserved in manuscripts. A modern printed literature in Shilha has developed since the 1970s.

Name 
This name is morphologically a feminine noun, derived from masculine  "male speaker of Shilha". Shilha names of other languages are formed in the same way, for example  "an Arab",  "the Arabic language".

The origin of the names  and  has recently become a subject of debate (see Shilha people#Naming for various theories). The presence of the consonant  in the name suggests an originally exonymic (Arabic) origin. The first appearance of the name in a western printed source is found in Mármol's  (1573), which mentions the "indigenous Africans called Xilohes or Berbers".

The ending  (borrowed from the Arabic suffix ) forms denominal nouns and adjectives.

For example, the author Awzal (early 18th c.) speaks of  "a composition in that beautiful Tamazight".

Because Souss is the most heavily populated part of the language area, the name  (lit. "language of Souss") is now often used as a pars pro toto for the entire language.

Number of speakers 

Some authors mention a much higher number of Shilha speakers. Stroomer (2001a) estimated that there are "some 6 to 8 million" speakers, and he subsequently (2008) raised the number to "some 8 to 9 million". Stroomer does not refer to any published sources supporting his estimates, which are certainly too high.

Dialects 
Dialect differentiation within Shilha, such as it is, has not been the subject of any targeted research, but several scholars have noted that all varieties of Shilha are mutually intelligible. The first was Stumme, who observed that all speakers can understand each other, "because the individual dialects of their language are not very different." This was later confirmed by Ahmed Boukous, a Moroccan linguist and himself a native speaker of Shilha, who stated: "Shilha is endowed with a profound unity which permits the Shluh to communicate without problem, from the Ihahan in the northwest to the Aït Baamran in the southwest, from the Achtouken in the west to the Iznagen in the east, and from Aqqa in the desert to Tassaout in the plain of Marrakesh."

There exists no sharply defined boundary between Shilha dialects and the dialects of Central Atlas Tamazight (CAT). The dividing line is generally put somewhere along the line Marrakesh-Zagora, with the speech of the Ighoujdamen, Iglioua and Aït Ouaouzguite ethnic groups belonging to Shilha, and that of the neighboring Inoultan, Infedouak and Imeghran ethnic groups counted as CAT.

Writing systems 

Shilha has been written with several different alphabets. Historically, the Arabic script has been dominant. Usage of the Latin script emerged in the late 19th century. More recently there has been an initiative to write Shilha in Tifinagh.

Tifinagh

Latin script 
Many Shilha texts from the oral tradition have been published since the 19th century, transcribed in Latin script. Early publications display a wide variety of transcription systems. Stumme (1899) and Destaing (1920, 1940) use an elaborate phonetic transcription, while Justinard (1914) and Laoust (1936) employ a transcription based on French orthographical conventions. A new standard was set by Aspinion (1953), who uses a simple but accurate, largely phonemic transcription with hyphenation.

Most academic publications on Berber languages of recent decades use a version of the Berber Latin alphabet, a transcription orthography in Latin script (as used in this article). The most unusual feature of this orthography is the employment of the symbol  (Greek epsilon) to represent  (voiced epiglottal fricative); for example,   "turban". Geminated and long consonants are transcribed with doubled symbols, for example,  "needle",  "flour". Word divisions are generally disjunctive, with clitics written as separate words (not hyphenated).

Arabic script 

Traditional orthography
Traditional Shilha manuscript texts are written in a conventionalized orthography in Maghribi Arabic script. This orthography has remained virtually unchanged since at least the end of the 16th century, and is still used today in circles of traditional Islamic scholars. Clitical elements are written connected to a noun or verb form (conjunctive spelling).

Modern orthography
Since the 1970s, a fair number of books in Shilha have been published inside Morocco, written in a newly devised, practical orthography in Arabic script. Word separations are mostly disjunctive.

Literature 

Shilha possesses an old literary tradition. Numerous texts written in Arabic script are preserved in manuscripts dating from the past four centuries. The best known writer in this tradition is Mḥmmd u Ɛli Awzal (Muḥammad ibn ʿAlī al-Hawzālī, died 1749), author of  "The Cistern" (a handbook of Maliki law in verse),  "The Ocean of Tears" (an adhortation, with a description of Judgment Day, in verse) and other texts.

Research 
The first attempt at a grammatical description of Shilha is the work of the German linguist Hans Stumme (1864–1936), who in 1899 published his . Stumme's grammar remained the richest source of grammatical information on Shilha for half a century. A problem with the work is its use of an over-elaborate, phonetic transcription which, while designed to be precise, generally fails to provide a transparent representation of spoken forms. Stumme also published a collection of Shilha fairy tales (1895, re-edited in Stroomer 2002).

The next author to grapple with Shilha is Saïd Cid Kaoui (Saʿīd al-Sidqāwī, 1859-1910), a native speaker of Kabyle from Algeria. Having published a dictionary of Tuareg (1894), he then turned his attention to the Berber languages of Morocco. His  (1907) contains extensive vocabularies in both Shilha and Central Atlas Tamazight, in addition to some 20 pages of useful phrases. The work seems to have been put together in some haste and must be consulted with caution.

On the eve of the First World War there appeared a small, practical booklet composed by Captain (later Colonel) Léopold Justinard (1878–1959), entitled . It contains a short grammatical sketch, a collection of stories, poems and songs, and some interesting dialogues, all with translations. The work was written while the author was overseeing military operations in the region of Fès, shortly after the imposition of the French protectorate (1912). Justinard also wrote several works on the history of the Souss.

Emile Laoust (1876–1952), prolific author of books and articles about Berber languages, in 1921 published his  (2nd enlarged edition 1936), a teaching grammar with graded lessons and thematic vocabularies, some good ethnographic texts (without translations) and a wordlist.

Edmond Destaing (1872–1940) greatly advanced knowledge of the Shilha lexicon with his  (1920) and his  (1940, with copious lexical notes). Destaing also planned a grammar which was to complete the trilogy, but this was never published.

Aspinion's simple but accurate transcriptions did away with earlier phonetic and French-based systems.

The first attempted description in English is Outline of the Structure of Shilha (1958) by American linguist Joseph Applegate (1925–2003). Based on work with native speakers from Ifni, the work is written in a dense, inaccessible style, without a single clearly presented paradigm. Transcriptions, apart from being unconventional, are unreliable throughout.

The only available accessible grammatical sketch written in a modern linguistic frame is "" (1988) by Lionel Galand (1920–2017), a French linguist and berberologist. The sketch is mainly based on the speech of the Ighchan ethnic group of the Anti-Atlas, with comparative notes on Kabyle of Algeria and Tuareg of Niger.

More recent, book-length studies include Jouad (1995, on metrics), Dell & Elmedlaoui (2002 and 2008, on syllables and metrics), El Mountassir (2009, a teaching grammar), Roettger (2017, on stress and intonation) and the many text editions by Stroomer (see also ).

Phonology

Stress and intonation 
Stress and intonation in Shilha are the subject of a monograph by Roettger (2017), who used instrumental testing. He established the fact that Shilha does not have lexical stress (Roettger 2017:59), as noted earlier by Stumme (1899:14) and Galand (1988, 2.16).

Vowels 
Shilha has three phonemic vowels, with length not a distinctive feature. The vowels show a fairly wide range of allophones. The presence of a pharyngealized consonant invites a more centralized realization of the vowel, as in   "three",   "four",   "six" (compare   "one",   "two",   "five").

Additional phonemic vowels occur sporadically in recent loanwords, for example  as in  "restaurant" (from French).

Transitional vowels and "schwa" 
In addition to the three phonemic vowels, there are non-phonemic transitional vowels, often collectively referred to as "schwa". Typically, a transitional vowel is audible following the onset of a vowelless syllable CC or CCC, if either of the flanking consonants, or both, are voiced, for example   "house",   "schoolboy". In the phonetic transcriptions of Stumme (1899) and Destaing (1920, 1940), many such transitional vowels are indicated.

Later authors such as Aspinion (1953), use the symbol  to mark the place where a transitional vowel may be heard, irrespective of its quality, and they also write  where in reality no vowel, however short, is heard, for example   "owner of livestock",   "he's eating". The symbol , often referred to as "schwa", as used by Aspinion and others, thus becomes a purely graphical device employed to indicate that the preceding consonant is a syllable onset: , . As Galand has observed, the notation of "schwa" in fact results from "habits which are alien to Shilha". And, as conclusively shown by Ridouane (2008), transitional vowels or "intrusive vocoids" cannot even be accorded the status of epenthetic vowels. It is therefore preferable not to write transitional vowels or "schwa", and to transcribe the vowels in a strictly phonemic manner, as in Galand (1988) and all recent text editions.

Treatment of hiatus 
Hiatus does not occur within a morpheme, i.e. a morpheme never contains a sequence of two vowels without an intervening consonant. If hiatus arises when a morpheme-final vowel and a morpheme-initial vowel come together in context, there are several strategies for dealing with it. The first of the two vowels may be elided or, alternatively, the semivowel  may be inserted to keep the vowels apart:
 →  or  "barley as well as maize"
 →  or  "set us free!"
Less commonly, vowels  and  may change into  and : // "go ye!"

Consonants 

The chart below represents Tashlhiyt consonants in IPA, with orthographical representations added between angled brackets when different:

Like other Berber languages and Arabic, Tashlhiyt has both pharyngealized ("emphatic") and plain dental consonants. There is also a distinction between labialized and plain dorsal obstruents. Consonant gemination or length is contrastive.

Semivowels 
In most dialects, the semivowels are thus in complementary distribution with the high vowels, with the semivowels occurring as onset or coda, and the high vowels as nucleus in a syllable. This surface distribution of the semivowels and the high vowels has tended to obscure their status as four distinct phonemes, with some linguists denying phonemic status to /w/ and /j/.

Positing four distinct phonemes is necessitated by the fact that semivowels and high vowels can occur in sequence, in lexically determined order, for example  "bee",  "ewe" (not *, *). The assumption of four phonemes also results in a more efficient description of morphology.

Gemination and length 
There is a phonemic contrast between single and non-single (geminated or long) consonants:
 "grass" vs.  "testimony"
 "pool" vs.  "sparrowhawk"
Gemination and degemination play a role in the morphology of nouns and verbs:
 "king",  "kings" ( becomes )
 "he harvested",  "he is harvesting" ( becomes )
All consonants can in principle occur geminated or long, although phonemic  and  do not seem to be attested. The uvular stops only occur geminated or long.

Four consonants have each two corresponding geminate or long consonants, one phonetically identical and one different:
 :  and 
 :  and 
 :  and 
 :  and 
 "slaughter",  "he is slaughtering" (compare  "plough",  "he is ploughing")
 "be red",  "it is red" (compare  "be black",  "it is black")
Whether a non-single consonant is realized as geminated or as long depends on the syllabic context. A geminated consonant is a sequence of two identical consonants /CC/, metrically counting as two segments, and always separated by syllable division, as in  [ta.md.da.] "sparrowhawk". A long consonant is a consonant followed by a chroneme /C:/, metrically counting as a single segment and belonging to one syllable, as in  [tu.g:a.] "testimony". When a morpheme contains a non-single consonant, it can be either geminated or long, depending on the context:
 [] "run!" (geminate)
 [] "run ye!" (long)
It is also possible for two identical consonants to occur in sequence, both being released separately and constituting the onset and nucleus of a vowelless syllable. Such sequences are transcribed with an intervening apostrophe:
 [] "jackals"
 [] "he pondered"
 [] "bat"

Syllable structure 
Shilha syllable structure has been the subject of a detailed and highly technical discussion by phoneticians. The issue was whether Shilha does or does not have vowelless syllables. According to John Coleman, syllables which are vowelless on the phonemic level have "schwa" serving as vocalic nucleus on the phonetic level. According to Rachid Ridouane on the other hand, Shilha's apparently vowelless syllables are truly vowelless, with all phonemes, vowels as well as consonants, capable of serving as nucleus. The discussion is summed up in Ridouane (2008, with listing of relevant publications), where he conclusively demonstrates that a perfectly ordinary Shilha phrase such as  "you took it away" indeed consists of three vowelless syllables [tk.ks.tst:.], each made up of voiceless consonants only, and with voiceless consonants (not "schwa") serving as nucleus. Many definitions of the syllable that have been put forward do not cover the syllables of Shilha.

Syllable types 
The syllable structure of Shilha was first investigated by Dell and Elmedlaoui in a seminal article (1985). They describe how syllable boundaries can be established through what they call "core syllabification". This works by associating a nucleus with an onset, to form a core syllable CV or CC. Segments that are higher on the sonority scale have precedence over those lower on the scale in forming the nucleus in a core syllable, with vowels and semivowels highest on the scale, followed by liquids and nasals, voiced fricatives, voiceless fricatives, voiced stops and voiceless stops. When no more segments are available as onsets, the remaining single consonants are assigned as coda to the preceding core syllable, but if a remaining consonant is identical to the consonant that is the onset of the following syllable, it merges with it to become a long consonant. A morpheme boundary does not necessarily constitute a syllable boundary.

Comparative diagram of the following:
Application of core syllabification produces the following Shilha syllable types:

Shilha syllable structure can be represented succinctly by the formula , in which C is any consonant (single/long), and X is any vowel or consonant (single) and with the restriction that in a syllable CXC the X, if it is a consonant, cannot be higher on the resonance scale than the syllable-final consonant, that is, syllables such as [tsk.] and [wrz.] are possible, but not *[tks.] and *[wzr.].

 [r.glt.] "close it!" (syllable C)
 [f:.ɣat.] "go out!" (syllable C:)
 [a.wi.tid.] "bring it here!" (syllable V)
 [ac.kid.] "come here!" (syllable VC)
Another exceptional syllable type, described by Dell and Elmedlaoui (1985), occurs in utterance-final position, when a syllable of the type CC or CC: is "annexed" to a preceding syllable of the type CV or C:V, for example  "be silent!" is [fs.samt.] not *[fs.sa.mt.].

Since any syllable type may precede or follow any other type, and since any consonant can occur in syllable-initial or final position, there are no phonotactical restrictions on consonant sequences. This also means that the concept of the consonant cluster is not applicable in Shilha phonology, as any number of consonants may occur in sequence:

[fr.ḥɣs.lm.ɛrf.tn.nk.] (6 syllables, 14 consonants, no vowels)

Metrics 
The metrics of traditional Shilha poems, as composed and recited by itinerant bards, was first described and analyzed by Hassan Jouad (thesis 1983, book 1995; see also Dell and Elmedlaoui 2008). The traditional metrical system confirms the existence of vowelless syllables in Shilha, and Jouad's data have been used by Dell and Elmedlaoui, and by Ridouane to support their conclusions.

The metrical system imposes the following restrictions:
each line in a poem contains the same number of syllables as all the other lines
each syllable in a line contains the same number of segments as its counterpart in other lines
each line contains one particular syllable that must begin or end with a voiced consonant
each line is divided into feet, with the last syllable in each foot stressed ("lifted") in recitation
Within these restrictions, the poet is free to devise his own metrical form. This can be recorded in a meaningless formula called  which shows the number and the length of the syllables, as well as the place of the obligatory voiced consonant (Jouad lists hundreds of such formulae).

The system is illustrated here with a quatrain ascribed to the semi-legendary Shilha poet Sidi Ḥammu (fl. 18th century) and published by Amarir (1987:64):

Application of Dell and Elmedlaoui's core syllabification reveals a regular mosaic of syllables:

Grammar

Nouns 
On the basis of their morphology, three types of Shilha nouns can be distinguished, two indigenous types and one type of external origin:
inflected nouns
uninflected nouns
unincorporated loans
The relevant morpho-syntactic categories are gender, number and state.

Inflected nouns 
Inflected nouns are by far the most numerous type. These nouns can be easily recognised from their outward shape: they begin with a nominal prefix which has the form :
 "daytime"
 "orphan"
 "hound"
 "evening"
 "marsh mallow (plant)"
 "ant"
Gender and number are all explicitly marked, but historical and synchronic sound changes have in some cases resulted in the neutralization of the difference between EL and EA.

The nominal prefix has no semantic content, i.e. it is not a sort of (in)definite article, although it is probably demonstrative in origin. It is made up of one or both of two elements, a gender prefix and a vocalic prefix. Singular feminine nouns may also have a gender suffix. For example, the noun  "bee" has the feminine prefix , the vocalic prefix  and the feminine singular suffix  added to the nominal stem . While feminine inflected nouns always have the feminine prefix, masculine nouns do not have a gender prefix in the free state (EL); for example  "fox" has no gender prefix, but only a vocalic prefix  added to the nominal stem .

Gender is thus marked unambiguously, albeit asymmetrically. In just a handful of nouns, the morphological gender does not conform to the grammatical gender (and number):  "sheep and goats" is morphologically masculine singular, but takes feminine plural agreement;  "eyes" is morphologically masculine plural, but takes feminine plural agreement;  "(someone's) children, offspring" is morphologically feminine singular, but takes masculine plural agreement.

The annexed state (EA) is regularly formed by reducing the vocalic prefix to zero and, with masculine nouns, adding the masculine gender prefix : 
EL  "bee" → EA 
EL  "fox" → EA 
With some nouns, the original vocalic prefix has fused with a stem-initial vowel, to produce an inseparable (and irreducible) vowel:
EL  "moon, month" → EA  (not *)
EL  "sun" → EA  (not *)
With feminine nouns that have an inseparable vocalic prefix, the difference between EL and EA is thus neutralized.

While most inflected nouns have a vocalic prefix , some have  (in some cases inseparable), and a few have  (always inseparable). The table below presents an overview (all examples are singular; plurals also distinguish EL and EA):

The EA is not predictable from the shape of the noun, compare:
 "hand" → EA 
 "knee" → EA 
The phonological rules on the realization of /w/ and /j/ apply to the EA as well. For example, the EA of  "chief" is /w-mɣar/, realized as  after a vowel,  after a consonant:
 "the chief went to see the judge"
 "the chief accompanied the judge"
Inflected nouns show a great variety of plural formations, applying one or more of the following processes:
suffixation (masculine , feminine )
vowel change (insertion or elision, or ablaut)
consonant gemination or degemination
stem extension (+, +, +, +, always in combination with a suffix)
There are also irregular and suppletive plurals. The feminine singular suffix  is naturally lost in the plural.

An inseparable vocalic prefix either remains unchanged, or changes as part of vowel change (but if the vocalic prefix is inseparable in the singular, it may be separable in the plural, as with  "dune", and vice versa, as with  "dog"; see table below).

Below is a sample of nouns, illustrating various plural formations.

The plural is generally not predictable from the shape of the singular, compare:
 "shoe", plural  (vowel change and suffix)
 "utensil", plural  (stem extension and suffix)

Many Shilha place-names are morphologically inflected nouns:
 "Anammeur"
 " Irhoreïsene"
 "Taroudant"
 "Tizegzaouine"
The same is the case with Shilha ethnic names:
 "the Ammeln" (singular )
 "the Achtouken" (singular )
 "the Ilallen" (singular )
 "the Isouktan" (singular )
Among the inflected nouns are found many incorporated loans. Examples include:
 "wax" (from Latin)
 "reeds" (from Punic)
 "vegetable plot, orchard" (from early Romance)
 "Muslim" (from Arabic)
 "letter, missive" (from Arabic)

Uninflected nouns 
This is the least common type, which also includes some loans. Examples:
 "cuckoo"
 "thirst"
 "thumb"
 "tar" (from Arabic)
 "station" (from French)
 "index finger"
 "couscous"
 "cricket"
 "carrots"

It is probable that all uninflected nouns were originally masculine. The few that now take feminine agreement contain elements that have been reanalyzed as marking feminine gender, for example  "kind of spider" (initial  seen as feminine prefix),  "bat" (not an Arabic loanword, but final  analyzed as the Arabic feminine ending).

Many uninflected nouns are collectives or non-count nouns which do not have a separate plural form. Those that have a plural make it by preposing the pluralizer , for example  "stations".

The uninflected noun  or  "people, humans" is morphologically masculine singular but takes masculine plural agreement.

Names of people and foreign place-names can be seen as a subtype of uninflected nouns, for example  (man's name),  (woman's name),  "Fès",  "Portugal". Gender is not transparently marked on these names, but those referring to humans take gender agreement according to the natural sex of the referent (male/masculine, female/feminine).

Unincorporated loans 
These are nouns of Arabic origin (including loans from French and Spanish through Arabic) which have largely retained their Arabic morphology. They distinguish two genders (not always unambiguously marked) and two numbers (explicitly marked). A notable feature of these nouns is that they are borrowed with the Arabic definite article, which is semantically neutralized in Shilha:
Moroccan Arabic  "the pistol" → Shilha  "the pistol, a pistol"
Moroccan Arabic  "the coffin" → Shilha  "the coffin, a coffin"
The Arabic feminine ending  is often replaced with the Shilha feminine singular suffix :
Moroccan Arabic  → Shilha  "fruit"
Moroccan Arabic  → Shilha  "tomb of a saint"
Arabic loans usually retain their gender in Shilha.
Moroccan Arabic  "the prophetic tradition" (masculine) → Shilha  (feminine)
Moroccan Arabic  "death" (masculine) → Shilha  (feminine)
Arabic plurals are usually borrowed with the singulars. If the borrowed plural is not explicitly marked for gender (according to Arabic morphology) it has the same gender as the singular:
 "domestic animal" (feminine), plural  (feminine)
 "buckle" (masculine), plural  (masculine)
Loanwords whose singular is masculine may have a plural which is feminine, and marked as such (according to Arabic morphology), for example  "flag" (masculine), plural  (feminine).

Use of the annexed state 
The annexed state (EA) of an inflected noun is used in a number of clearly defined syntactical contexts:
when the noun occurs as subject in postverbal position:

after most prepositions (see also ):

after numerals 1 to 10 and after the indefinite numeral (see also ):

after some elements which require a following noun phrase (see also ):
  "the people of Agadir"
  "he with EA-reed: flute player" (EL )
after  "like, such as" (premodern, obsolete in the modern language)

Outside these contexts, the EL is used. Uninflected nouns and unincorporated loans, which do not distinguish state, remain unchanged in these contexts.

Semantics of feminine nouns 
The formation of feminine nouns from masculine nouns is a productive process. A feminine noun is formed by adding both the feminine nominal prefix  (and, if necessary, a vocalic prefix), and the feminine singular suffix  to a masculine noun. The semantic value of the feminine derivation is variable.

For many nouns referring to male and female humans or animals (mainly larger mammals), matching masculine and feminine forms exist with the same nominal stem, reflecting the sex of the referent:
 "widower" →  "widow"
 "Muslim" →  "Muslima"
 "twin boy" →  "twin girl"
 "cock, rooster" →  "hen"
 "lion" →  "lioness"
 "moufflon" →  "female moufflon"
In a few cases there are suppletive forms:
 "man, husband" ―  "woman, wife"
 "buck" ―  "goat"
Feminine nouns derived from masculine nouns with inanimate reference have diminutive meaning:
 "stone" →  "small stone"
 "cave" →  "hole, lair"
 "room" →  "small room"
 "box" →  "little box"
 "garden" →  "small garden"
Conversely, a masculine noun derived from a feminine noun has augmentative meaning:
 "lake" →  "large lake"
 "house" →  "large house"
 "fan palm" →  "large fan palm"
Feminine nouns derived from masculine collective nouns have singulative meaning:
 "maize" →  "a cob"
 "peppers" →  "a pepper"
 "aubergines" →  "an aubergine"
 "matches" →  "a match"
Feminine derivations are also used as names of languages, professions and activities:
  "Dutchman" →  "the Dutch language"
  "the French" →  "the French language"
  "blacksmith" →  "blacksmith's profession"
  "beggar" →  "begging"
  "miser" →  "avarice"
  "(my) brother" →  "brotherhood"
There is an overlap here with feminine nouns denoting females:
  "Frenchwoman" and "the French language"
  "beggarwoman" and "begging"

Nominal deictic clitics 
There are three deictic clitics which can follow a noun: proximal  "this, these", distal  "that, those" (compare ) and anaphoric  "the aforementioned":
  "[as for] this honey, it is not expensive"
  "the cold has badly afflicted that goat"
  "then he gave the bird to some children to play with"

Personal pronouns
There are three basic sets of personal pronouns:
independent
direct object clitics
suffixes
In addition, there are two derived sets which contain the suffixed pronouns (except in 1st singular):
indirect object clitics
possessive complements
Gender is consistently marked on 2nd singular, and on 2nd and 3rd plural. Gender is not consistently marked on 3rd singular and 1st plural. Gender is never marked on 1st singular.

The independent ("overt") pronouns are used to topicalize the subject or the object.

They are also used with certain pseudo-prepositions such as  "like",  "except":

The direct object clitics are used with transitive verbs:

The 3rd singular feminine variant  is used after a dental stop, compare:
 "bring her here!" (imperative singular)
 "bring her here!" (imperative plural masculine)
The direct object clitics are also used to indicate the subject with pseudo-verbs, and with the presentative particle  "here is, ":
 (alone me) "I alone"
 (all them) "they all, all of them"
 (absent him) "he's not there, he's disappeared"
 (where her) "where is she?"
 (here.is me) "here I am"
The pronominal suffixes are used with prepositions to indicate the object (see ), and with a closed set of necessarily possessed kinship terms to indicate possession (see ). The plural forms add an infix  before the suffix with kinship terms, for example  "our father" (never *); this infix also occurs with some prepositions as a free or dialectal variant of the form without the :
 or  "on them"
 "with them" (never *)

The indirect object clitics convey both benefactive and detrimental meaning:

The possessive complements follow the noun (see ).

Prepositions 
Prepositions can have up to three different forms, depending on the context in which they are used:
before a noun or demonstrative pronoun
with a pronominal suffix
independent in relative clause
The form before nouns and demonstrative pronouns and the independent form are identical for most prepositions, the exception being the dative preposition  (independent).

Most prepositions require a following inflected noun to be in the annexed state (EA) (see ). Exceptions are  "until",  "toward" (in some modern dialects, and in premodern texts) and prepositions borrowed from Arabic (not in the table) such as  "after" and  "before".

The instrumental and allative prepositions  "by means of" (with EA) and  "toward" (with EL) were still consistently kept apart in premodern manuscript texts. In most modern dialects they have been amalgamated, with both now requiring the EA, and with the pre-pronominal forms each occurring with both meanings:  "toward it" (now also "with it"),  "with it" (now also "toward it").

The use of the different forms is illustrated here with the preposition  "in":

Two prepositions can be combined:

Spatial relations are also expressed with phrases of the type "on top of":
 "on top of the dung heap"
 "beside the road"
 "in the midst of the river"
The preposition  "in" with pronominal suffixes, with all its free and dialectal variants, is presented below. The other prepositions display a much smaller variety of forms.

Numerals 
The inherited cardinal numeral system consists of ten numerals (still in active use) and three numeral nouns (now obsolete) for "a tensome", "a hundred" and "a thousand". There is also an indefinite numeral meaning "several, many" or "how many?" which morphologically and syntactically patterns with the numerals 1 to 10. For numbers of 20 and over, Arabic numerals are commonly used.

Numerals 1 to 10, indefinite numeral 
These are listed below. The formation of feminine "one" and "two" is irregular.

The numerals 1 to 10 are constructed with nouns (inflected nouns in the EA), the gender of the numeral agreeing with that of the noun:

The same obtains with the indefinite numeral:
 "several/many EA-horses, how many horses?"
 "several/many EA-cows, how many cows?"
Numerals ,  "one" also serve as indefinite article, for example  "one Westerner, a Westerner", and they are used independently with the meaning "anyone", "anything":
 "he didn't see anyone"
 "I'm not afraid of anything"
The final  of masculine  "one" and  "two" is often assimilated or fused to a following ,  or :
  →  "one EA-day"
  →  "one EA-year"
  →  "a place"
  →  "two EA-years"
  →  "two EA-months"

Teens 
The teens are made by connecting the numerals 1 to 9 to the numeral 10 with the preposition  "with". In the premodern language, both numerals took the gender of the counted noun, with the following noun in the plural (EA):

In the modern language, fused forms have developed in which the first numeral is always masculine, while the following noun is in the singular, and connected with the preposition  "of":

Tens, hundreds, thousands 
There are three inherited nouns to denote "a tensome", "a hundred" and "a thousand". These now seem to be obsolete, but they are well attested in the premodern manuscripts. Morphologically, they are ordinary inflected nouns.

The tens, hundreds and thousand were formed by combining the numerals 1 to 10 with the numeral nouns:

The numeral nouns are connected with the preposition  "of" to a noun, which is most often in the singular:

In the modern language the Arabic tens are used, which have developed a separate feminine form:

The numerals between the tens are most frequently made with the Arabic numerals 1 to 10:

The Arabic hundreds and thousands are used in the modern language, taking the places of the original numeral nouns while the original syntax is maintained:

There is also a vigesimal system built on the Arabic numeral  "twenty, score", for example:

Ordinal numerals 
First and last are usually expressed with relative forms of the verbs  "to be first" and  "to be last":

There are also agent nouns derived from these verbs which are apposed to a noun or used independently:

The other ordinals are formed by prefixing masc. , fem.  to a cardinal numeral, which is then constructed with a plural noun in the usual manner:

The ordinal prefixes is also used with Arabic numerals and with the indefinite numeral:
 "the 25th [day] of [the month] Dhū al-Qaʿda"
 "the how-manieth time?"

Verbs 
A Shilha verb form is basically a combination of a person-number-gender (PNG) affix and a mood-aspect-negation (MAN) stem.

Sample verb 
The workings of this system are illustrated here with the full conjugation of the verb  "to give". The perfective negative goes with the negation  "not". The imperfective goes with the preverbal particle  (except usually the imperative, and the relative forms).

The verb  "give" has the full complement of four different MAN stems:
Aorist  ―  in 1st, 2nd and 3rd singular, 1st plural, and the imperatives, but  in 2nd and 3rd plural
Perfective  ―  in 1st and 2nd singular, but  with the other forms
Perfective negative  ― all forms
Imperfective  (an irregular formation) ― all forms

Person-number-gender affixes 
There are two basic sets of PNG affixes, one set marking the subject of ordinary verb forms, and another set marking the subject of imperatives.

Two suffixes (singular , plural ) are added to the 3rd singular and masculine 3rd plural masculine verb forms respectively to make relative forms (also known as "participles"), as in  "who gives",  "who give".

Mood-aspect-negation stems 
A few verbs have just one MAN stem. The majority of verbs have two, three or four different MAN stems. The Aorist stem serves as the citation form of a verb. The list below offers an overview of MAN stem paradigms. Around 15 paradigms of non-derived verbs can be recognized, based on the formation of the Perfective and the Perfective negative. Further subdivisions could be made on the basis of the formations of the Imperfective. All sections in the list contain a selection of verbs, except sections 12, 14, and 15, which contain a full listing.

Uses of MAN stems 
The table below is adapted from Kossmann (2012:40, table 2.12 Uses of MAN stems in Figuig Berber).

Stative verbs 
Shilha has around twenty stative verbs which are still recognizable as a separate type of verb on the basis of their MAN stem paradigms. In earlier stages of the language, these verbs had their own separate set of PNG markers, which are sporadically found in premodern manuscripts:
 "the night, it is long" (cf. modern )
 "medicines are bitter" (cf. modern )
In the modern language, these verbs take the regular PNG markers. Stative verbs do not have a separate Perfective negative form. The table shows a selection of stative verbs.

Verbal deictic clitics
There are two deictic clitics which are used with verbs to indicate movement toward or away from the point of reference: centripetal  "hither" and centrifugal  "thither":

The use of these clitics is compulsory (idiomatic) with certain verbs. For example, the verb  "come" almost always goes with the centripetal particle, and  "find" with the centrifugal clitic:

Possession

Within a noun phrase 
A possessive construction within a noun phrase is most frequently expressed as Possessee  Possessor. The preposition  "of" requires a following inflected noun to be in the annexed state. This kind of possessive construction covers a wide range of relationships, including both alienable and inalienable possession, and most of them not involving actual ownership:
 "Daoud's waterhole"
 "the entrance of the grain silo"
 "Brahim's children"
 "pots of clay"
 "a little salt"
 "the price of maize"
 "after lunch"
 "the city of Istanbul"
 "the rising of the sun"
 "the road to school"
 "the religion of the Jews"
 "the story of Joseph"
Many such possessive constructions are compounds, whose meaning cannot be deduced from the ordinary meaning of the nouns:
 "road of straw: the Milky Way"
 "mouth of jackal: a length measure"
 "ravine of lice: nape, back of the neck"
 "needle of hedges: kind of bird"
The possessor can itself be a possessee in a following possessive construction:
 "the era of the reign of Moulay Lahcen"
 "the time of the giving birth of the sheep and goats"
 →  "the language of the Arabs"
 →  "horse-doctor"
 →  "the season of rain"
 →  "the king of the Muslims"
 →  "orange tree"
 →  "maize of Egypt"
The possessor can also be expressed with a pronominal possessive complement. This consists of a pronominal suffix added to the preposition, which then takes the shape  (see ). The form of the 1st singular possessive complement is anomalous:  after a vowel, and  after a consonant (or, in some dialects):
 "my head"
 "my hands"
 "my leg"
 "your (sg.m.) pouch"
 "your (sg.f.) affairs"
 "his clothes"
 "her opinion"
 "its smell"
 "our neighbours"
 "your (pl.m.) occupation"
 "your (pl.f.) friends"
 "their (m.) livelihood"
 "their (f.) locks of hair"

Within a clause 
There are two ways to express possession within a clause. The most common way is to use the "exist with" construction:

The verb  "exist" (perfective ) is usually omitted, leaving a verbless clause:

Alternatively, the verb  "hold, possess" can be used:

In addition, there is the verb  "possess" (perfective ), whose use is restricted to (inalienable) part-whole relationships and kinship relationships:

 , or 
(EL-hand-mill it.possesses one EA-handle)
"a hand-mill has one handle"
 , not *
(I.possess two EA-houses)
"I have two houses"

Possessed nouns 
These are a subtype of uninflected nouns. As with proper names, gender is not transparently marked on possessed nouns, which take gender agreement according to the natural sex of the referent. Plurals are either suppletive or made with the preposed pluralizer . Most possessed nouns are consanguinal kinship terms which require a possessive suffix (the table contains a selection).

These kinship terms cannot occur without pronominal suffix. Example:

If these nouns are part of an NP-internal possessive construction, possession must be indicated twice:

The suffix must also be added when possession is expressed in a clause:

Some kinship terms are not possessed nouns but inflected nouns which take possessive complements (see examples above).

Another group of possessed nouns require a following noun phrase, occurring only in an NP-internal possessive phrase. A following inflected noun must be in the EA.

These four possessed nouns occur as first element in compound kinship terms (see above;  then becomes  in  "the brother of"). They also serve to indicate descent, origin and ethnicity:
  "Ahmed son of Moussa" (name of a famous saint)
 "member of the Aït Brayyim ethnic group"
 "native of outside: a foreigner"
 "a native of Taroudant"
 "the natives of Aguercif"
 "native woman of Aglou"
 "the women of Tafraout"
When  is followed by another (phonemic)  the result is :
  →  "native of Ouijjane" (also surname: Gouijjane)
  →  "a man, son of a man: a man of virtue"
 occurs in many Shilha ethnonyms:
 "the Sons of Boubker" (Aït Boubker), singular 
 "the Sons of Ouafka" (Aït Ouafka), singular  →

Proprietive and privative elements 
The proprietive elements masc.  "he with, he of" and fem.  "she with, she of" are borrowed from Arabic (original meaning "father of", "mother of"). They are used as formative elements and require a following inflected noun to be in the annexed state. The plural is formed with the pluralizer :
 (he of seven EA-words) "a liar"
 (he of EA-forest) "wild boar"
 (he with EA-letters) "postman"
 (PL he with EA-bucket) "French soldiers (wearing a képi)"
In many cases,  fuses with a following nominal prefix:
  (he with EA-poetry) →  "a poet"
  (he with EA-frogs) →  "Biougra" (place-name)	
The feminine  is encountered less frequently:
 (she with EA-mats) "prayer room in a mosque"
 (she with delusion) "the world, worldly existence"
 (PL she with EA-threads) "needles"

The privative elements masc.  "he without" and fem.  "she without" are made up of a gender prefix (masculine , feminine ) and an element  which is probably related to the negation  "not". They do not require the annexed state, and should probably be translated as "who does not have", with the following noun phrase as object:
 (he without EL-partner) "God"
 (PL he without EL-job) "the unemployed"
 (she without EL-daylight) "wide-brimmed hat"
 (she without certainty) "the world, worldly existence"

Lexicon 

Tashlhiyt, like other Berber languages, has a small number of loanwords from Phoenician-Punic, Hebrew, and Aramaic. There are also Latin loans from the time of the Roman empire, although the region in which Tashlhiyt is spoken was never in the empire's territory.

Most Tashlhiyt loanwords are Arabic in origin. Maarten Kossmann estimates that about 6% of the basic Tashlhiyt lexicon is borrowed from Arabic; Salem Chaker estimates that 25% of the stable lexicon overall is borrowed from Arabic. 

Although some nouns denoting typically Islamic concepts such as  "mosque",  "ritual prayer",  "fasting", which certainly belong to the very oldest layer of Arabic loans, are fully incorporated into Shilha morphology, many equally central Islamic concepts are expressed with unincorporated nouns, for example  "Islam",  "pilgrimage to Mecca",  "alms tax". It is possible that during the early stages of islamization such concepts were expressed with native vocabulary or with earlier, non-Arabic loans. Another example is  "sins", obsolete in the modern language, but attested in a premodern manuscript text, whose singular  is borrowed from Romance (cf. Spanish , Latin ; modern Shilha uses  "sins", from Arabic).

Tashlhiyt numerals 5 to 9 may be loanwords, although their origin is unclear; they do not seem to originate from Phoenician-Punic or Arabic. Additionally, all Tashlhiyt numerals agree in gender, whereas Arabic numerals do not.

Secret languages 
He quotes an example:  "do you speak the secret language?"

Two secret languages used by Shilha women are described by Lahrouchi and Ségéral. They are called  (cf. They employ various processes, such as reduplication, to disguise the ordinary language.

Notes and references

Cited works and further reading

Various online articles
 
 
 
John Coleman, "Epenthetic vowels in Tashlhiyt Berber" (includes sound samples)

External links 

World atlas of language structures (WALS) – Tashlhiyt (data not entirely accurate)

EL:free state ("état libre")
EA:annexed state ("état d'annexion")
ORD:ordinal numeral

Berber languages
Berbers in Morocco
Languages of Morocco